António da Mota was a Portuguese trader and explorer, who in 1543 became one of the first Europeans to set foot in Japan.

Voyage
While traveling to Ningbo with a Chinese junk in 1543 (some sources say 1542), Mota and the rest of the crew were swept off course from a bad storm. Among the crew were around one hundred East Asians, and several Portuguese. The Portuguese included were Francisco Zeimoto, António Peixoto, and Mota himself. Fernão Mendes Pinto claimed that he was on the voyage as well, but this claim is unlikely due to the fact that he also claims he was (more accurately) in Burma at the same time. Driven from the storm, the ship lands on the island of Tanegashima on 25 August 1543. António Mota and Francisco Zeimoto are officially the first Europeans on Japanese soil. António Peixoto is not recorded as having landed, and presumably died at sea prior to the landing.

Mota and Zeimoto introduced handheld guns to Japan, which the Japanese found fascinating. From then on the Japanese would have a mass production on firearms in the decades that followed. The ship was then soon repaired and António Mota departed from Japan. The rest of his life is unknown.

See also 
 Japan-Portugal relations
 Nanban trade
 Portuguese discoveries
 Tanegashima (Japanese matchlock)

References

Portuguese explorers
Explorers of Asia
16th-century explorers
16th-century Portuguese people